The Julie Rogers Theater is a historic performing arts theater located on Pearl Street in downtown Beaumont, Texas.  Built in 1928, the theater was once Beaumont's City Hall and Auditorium. The capacity is approximately 1,663 seats.

Renovations
The building was renovated in 1982 when it was re-purposed from the city hall and auditorium combination to a theater for the performing arts.  The theater was renovated again in 2007.  The theater now features continental seating (no center aisle).  Seating includes 1,253 seats in orchestra seating, 144 seats in loge seating, and 266 seats in balcony seating.

Performances
This facility is home to the Symphony of Southeast Texas, and hosts performances of the Beaumont Civic Opera, the Beaumont Civic Ballet and the Beaumont Ballet Theatre.

Photo gallery

See also

National Register of Historic Places listings in Jefferson County, Texas
Jefferson Theatre Beaumont, Texas

References

External links

Theatres in Texas
Theatres completed in 1928
Buildings and structures in Beaumont, Texas
Theatres on the National Register of Historic Places in Texas
Tourist attractions in Beaumont, Texas
Historic district contributing properties in Texas
1928 establishments in Texas
National Register of Historic Places in Jefferson County, Texas
Music venues in Beaumont, Texas